Bossa Nova: New Brazilian Jazz is an album by Argentine composer, pianist and conductor Lalo Schifrin recorded in 1962 and released on the Audio Fidelity label. The album was released during the height of the popularity of bossa nova music in the early 1960s and was one of Schifrin's earliest solo albums after leaving Dizzy Gillespie's band.

Reception
The album peaked at 35 on the Billboard Albums Chart in 1963.

Track listing
 "Boato (Bistro)" (João Roberto Kelly) - 2:26
 "Chora Tua Tristeza" (Oscar Castro-Neves, Luvercy Fiorini) - 2:38
 "Poema Do Adeus" (Luís Antônio) - 3:19
 "Apito No Samba" (Luís Antônio, Luís Bandeira) - 2:50
 "Chega de Saudade" (Antônio Carlos Jobim, Vinicius de Moraes) - 5:19
 "Bossa Em Nova York" (Jose Paulo, Dom Madrid) - 1:52
 "O Amor E A Rosa" (João Pernambuco, Antônio Maria) - 3:34
 "O Menino Desce O Morro (Little Brown Boy)" (Maria De Rosa, Vera Brasil) - 2:28
 "Menina Feia" (Oscar Castro-Neves) - 2:25
 "Ouça" (Maysa Matarazzo) - 3:56
 "Samba de uma Nota Só" (Antônio Carlos Jobim, Newton Mendonça) - 3:44
 "Patinho Feio (aka Ugly Duckling)" (Oscar Castro-Neves) - 3:01
Recorded in New York City in June 1962

Personnel
Lalo Schifrin - piano, arranger
Leo Wright - alto saxophone, flute
Christopher White - bass
Rudy Collins - drums
Jose Paulo, Carmen Costa - Latin percussion

References

Lalo Schifrin albums
1962 albums
Albums arranged by Lalo Schifrin
Audio Fidelity Records albums